A catadioptric sensor  is a visual sensor that contains mirrors (catoptrics) and lenses (dioptrics), a combined catadioptric system. These are panoramic sensors created by pointing a camera at a curved mirror.

References 

Image sensors